The legislature of the U.S. state of New Jersey has convened many times since statehood became effective on December 18, 1787.

Legislatures
 1st, August 27, 1776
 211th, January 13, 2004 – January 10, 2006
 New Jersey General Assembly, 2004–06 term
 212th, January 10, 2006 – January 10, 2008
 New Jersey General Assembly, 2006–08 term
 213th, January 10, 2008 – January 12, 2010
 New Jersey General Assembly, 2008–10 term
 214th, January 12, 2010 – January 10, 2012
 New Jersey General Assembly, 2010–12 term
 215th New Jersey Legislature, January 10, 2012 – January 14, 2014
 216th New Jersey Legislature, January 14, 2014 – January 12, 2016
 217th New Jersey Legislature, January 12, 2016 – January 9, 2018
 218th New Jersey Legislature, January 9, 2018 – January 14, 2020
 219th New Jersey Legislature, January 14, 2020 – January 11, 2022
 220th New Jersey Legislature, January 11, 2022 - January 9, 2024

See also
 List of speakers of the New Jersey General Assembly
 List of presidents of the New Jersey Senate
 List of governors of New Jersey
 History of New Jersey

References

External links
 New Jersey State Library. Journal and Minutes of the Legislature, 1682-1987
 New Jersey Legislature. Legislative Calendar, 1997-2019
 
 

Legislatures
Legislature
 
 
 
New Jersey